In enzymology, a (S)-usnate reductase is an enzyme that catalyzes the chemical reaction

(6R)-2-acetyl-6-(3-acetyl-2,4,6-trihydroxy-5-methylphenyl)-3-hydroxy-6- methyl-2,4-cyclohexadien-1-one + NAD  (S)-usnic acid + NADH + H

In the reverse direction, (S)-usnate is reduced by NADH with cleavage of the ether bond to form a 7-hydroxy group.

This enzyme belongs to the family of oxidoreductases, specifically those acting on the CH-OH group of donor with NAD or NADP as acceptor. The systematic name of this enzyme class is reduced-(S)-usnate:NAD oxidoreductase (ether-bond-forming). This enzyme is also called L-usnic acid dehydrogenase.

References

 

EC 1.1.1
NADH-dependent enzymes
Enzymes of unknown structure